José Gutiérrez Hernández (born March 1, 1972), better known by his ring name Último Guerrero (Spanish for Last Warrior), is a Mexican  (or professional wrestler), who works for Consejo Mundial de Lucha Libre (CMLL). He is not related to the lucha libre legend Gory Guerrero or any of his children; "Guerrero" in this case is the Spanish word for warrior and not the surname of the character. On September 19, 2014, Último Guerrero lost a Lucha de Apuestas match to Atlantis, after which he was forced to unmask and reveal his birth name.

He is a former holder of the  CMLL World Heavyweight Championship, NWA World Historic Middleweight Championship, the CMLL World Tag Team Championship (where he and Dragón Rojo Jr. are the longest reigning tag team champions) and CMLL World Trios Championship on multiple occasions. Guerrero is a charter member of the stable of wrestlers known as Los Guerreros de Infierno / Los Guerreros de la Atlantida and has also made appearances for Total Nonstop Action Wrestling (TNA) in the United States. In TNA where he was part of Team Mexico, which won the 2008 World X Cup. Guerrero is the only wrestler to win the Torneo Gran Alternativa tournament three times and the CMLL Universal Championship tournament twice. He is also part of the CMLL booking committee.

Professional wrestling career

Early career (1990–1997)
Gutiérrez was trained in "Gimnasio El Ranchero" by Tinito and Halcón Suriano and made his debut in 1990 as "Halcón Dorado" (Spanish for "Golden Hawk"). Shortly after his debut he changed name and "ring persona", or gimmick, and became known as "Flanagan". He worked for several years in local promotions in his native Durango area before getting his first break in Promo Azteca. Guerrero and his training partner Super Punk changed their names in 1996 with Guerrero adopting the name "Último Guerrero" ("Last Warrior") and Super Punk becoming "Último Rebelde" as they started teaming together using a British hooligan inspired gimmick. The team was scheduled to lose their masks in a Luchas de Apuestas mask vs. mask" match (a "Bet match" where the loser would unmask), but instead Último Guerrero decided to join Consejo Mundial de Lucha Libre (CMLL; "World Wrestling Council") in late 1997 and thus saved his mask.

Consejo Mundial de Lucha Libre (1997–present)

Initially Guerrero worked lower card matches, in the first-to-third match on the show with some success. On September 11, 1998 he defeated Mr. Águila in his first ever Lucha de Apuestas match, forcing his opponent to unmask and reveal his real name as part of the CMLL 65th Anniversary Show. Mr. Águila already worked for the World Wrestling Federation without his mask, so it was not seen as a surprise that he lost to Guerrero. In 1999 Último Guerrero teamed up with veteran Blue Panther to win the Gran Alternativa ("Grea Alternative") tournament, a tournament where a young wrestler teams with a veteran. Winning the Gran Alternativa tournament is often a sign that the promotion has plans to move a wrestler up the rankings. Shortly after winning the tournament, Guerrero won a match that made him the number one contender for Great Sasuke's NWA World Middleweight Championship. Último Guerrero did not win the match but the fact that he worked a featured match in CMLL's main arena, Arena México, showed that the company had plans for him.

Los Infernales (1999–2001)

In 1999 El Satánico reformed the group Los Infernales, recruiting Último Guerrero and Rey Bucanero for the group. Working with the veteran El Satánico allowed both Último Guerrero and Rey Bucanero to rise up the ranks as well as develop into a regular tag team in CMLL. In the summer of 2000 Bucanero and Guerrero were one of sixteen teams entered into a tournament for the vacant CMLL World Tag Team Championship. In the end they defeated Villano IV and Mr. Niebla to win the championship. Throughout the summer of 2000 El Satánico had been working a storyline against Tarzan Boy, which was used to turn both Bucanero and Último Guerrero against El Satánico. Bucanero, Guerrero and Tarzan Boy claimed that they deserved the name Los Infernales and that El Satánico was holding them back. For the storyline El Satánico recruited two other wrestlers to even the numbers, which on TV was presented as if he used his "Satanic powers" to turn wrestler Rencor Latino into Averno (Spanish for "Hell") and transformed the Astro Rey Jr. into a character known as Mephisto. When Tarzan Boy was injured and unable to wrestle Bucanero and Guerrero recruited Máscara Mágica to even the numbers. The storyline between the two factions reaches its high point at the CMLL 68th Anniversary Show where all seven wrestlers faced off in a steel cage match. The stipulation of the match was that the winning side would gain the rights to use the name Los Infernales while the loser on the opposite side would be forced to unmask or have their hair shaved off. In the end El Satánico pinned Máscara Mágica, forcing him to unmask. After losing the match Guerrero, Bucanero and Tarzan Boy became known collectively as Los Guerreros del Infierno (The Infernal Soldiers).

Los Guerreros del Infierno (2001–2005)

After the feud with El Satánico ended Bucanero and Guerrero moved on to a storyline feud with Negro Casas and El Hijo del Santo over the CMLL World Tag Team Championship. After a match with an inconclusive finish in October, Los Guerreros lost to Santo and Casas on November 2, 2001. In 2002, Guerrero and Bucanero regained their tag team title from Santo and Casas. defeating them on May 31 to become three-time champions. The team successfully defended their title against Damián 666 and Halloween of La Familia de Tijuana in July. Los Guerreros del Infierno then began feuding with Vampiro Canadiense and Shocker. Los Guerreros successfully defended their tag team championship against the duo but Bucanero lost his hair to Vampiro in a Luchas de Apuestas match in December. In December 2002, Último Guerrero defeated Shocker for the CMLL World Light Heavyweight Championship, his first singles title in CMLL. The storyline continued into 2003 with Shocker defeating Guerrero in a singles match to earn a title shot but losing against Guerrero when the title was on the line a week later.  When L.A. Park signed with CMLL in December 2003, he aligned himself with Shocker and they immediately began to feud with Guerrero and Bucanero.  Los Guerreros regained the tag team championship in early 2004, but Bucanero suffered a knee injury and was temporarily replaced by Black Warrior. Los Guerreros lost the tag team title to Atlantis and Blue Panther on June 25. Bucanero and new Los Guerreros member Olímpico challenged Atlantis and Panther for the tag team championship on the first Arena México show of 2005 but they lost when Olímpico injured his neck while attempting a dive. Bucanero and Olímpico teamed up to unsuccessfully challenge the visiting Hiroshi Tanahashi and Shinsuke Nakamura for the IWGP World Tag Team Championship. In 2005, Último Guerrero began an angle with Místico during the early part of the year, losing a singles match to him on February 25. 2005 leading to a tag program with Guerrero and Bucanero against Místico and Dr. Wagner Jr.

Los Guerreros de la Atlantida (2005–2011)

Near the end of 2005 Guerrero helped Atlantis during a match, thus turning Atlantis rudo for the first time in his career. When he joined Los Guerreros the group changed their name to Los Guerreros de la Atlantida (the Warriors of the Atlantis). In May 2006, Guerrero won CMLL's annual "International Grand Prix" tournament that featured wrestler for Mexico, Japan and the United States. later on Los Guerreros ejected Rey Bucanero from the group, with Guerrero and Tarzan Boy tearing up Bucanero's tights, signifying he was no longer a member of the group. On July 14, 2006 Rey Bucanero defeated Guerrero for CMLL World Light Heavyweight Championship, ending the reign after 3 and a half years.

On June 29, 2007, CMLL's annual Gran Alternativa tournament took place at Arena Mexico. Guerrero teamed up with Euforia, but the team was defeated by Místico and his partner La Sombra. After the loss Guerrero publicly asked Dr. Wagner, Jr. to join him for a challenge to Místico and Negro Casas for the CMLL Tag Team Championship. The match was held on July 13, 2007 at Arena Mexico and saw Guerrero and Wagner win the championship. A week later Guerrero and Wagner lost the titles back to Místico and Casas, making the team the shortest reigning CMLL World Tag Team Champions ever. The loss caused the two fighting in mutual accusations of betrayal, which in turn led to a feud between the two wrestlers. On July 27, at Arena Mexico, Dr. Wagner, Jr. and Místico held a mano a mano match which was decided by a treacherous intervention by Guerrero, who climbed into the ring, attacked Wagner from behind and caused him to lose the match, then the aftermath, Guerrero ripped off Wagner's mask. On August 3, 2007, Guerrero teamed up with Atlantis and Sangre Azteca against Dr. Wagner Jr., Alex Koslov and Volador Jr. at Arena México after the match Guerrero took the microphone and challenged Wagner for a mask versus mask match but no match ever came of it as Dr. Wagner, Jr. left CMLL shortly after. In 2008 Último Guerrero teamed with newcomer Dragón Rojo Jr. to win the 2008 Gran Alternativa tournament.

After Blue Panther lost his mask to Villano V, Guerrero began siding with Panther as they were both "Laguneros" (from the "lagoon" area of Mexico) seeking revenge for the unmasking. Guerrero, Panther, Black Warrior and other wrestlers from "the lagoon" formed a group called La Ola Lagunero (Spanish for "the Lagoon Wave") and feuded with Los Villanos. On December 22, 2008 Guerrero defeated Dos Caras Jr. to win the CMLL World Heavyweight Championship. On March 20, 2009 Último Guerrero faced Villano V in a mask vs mask match at the Homenaje a Dos Leyendas show. Guerrero won two falls to one and thus forced Villano V to unmask and reveal his real name as per Lucha Libre tradition. On April 2, 2009 Guerrero successfully defended his CMLL World title against Rey Mendoza Jr. (the unmasked Villano V) on an independent wrestling promotion show in Gómez Palacio, Durango, marking the first time the CMLL championship was defended on a non-CMLL show. On July 12, 2010, at the Promociones Gutiérrez 1st Anniversary Show Último Guerrero participated in a match where 10 men put their mask on the line in a match that featured five pareja incredibles teams, with the losing team being forced to wrestle each other with their mask on the line. His partner in the match was Averno, facing off against the teams of Atlantis and Olímpico, Místico and El Oriental, Histeria and La Sombra, Volador Jr. and El Alebrije. Averno and Último Guerrero was the third team to escape the match. In the end Místico defeated El Oriental to unmask him. Último Guerrero was one of 14 men who put their mask on the line in a Luchas de Apuestas steel cage match, in the main event of the CMLL 77th Anniversary Show. Último Guerrero was the eighth man to leave the steel cage, keeping his mask safe. The match came down to La Sombra pinning Olímpico to unmask him. On November 2, 2010, Guerrero and Dragón Rojo Jr. defeated Los Invasores (Mr. Águila and Héctor Garza) to win the CMLL World Tag Team Championship. After the title win, Rojo Jr. was made an official member of Los Guerreros de la Atlantida. On April 8, 2011, Último Guerrero won his third Gran Alternativa tournament, this time teaming with Escorpión, becoming the first person to have won the tournament three times. In May, Guerrero became a member of the CMLL booking committee. On August 12, Guerrero lost the CMLL World Heavyweight Championship to Héctor Garza, ending his reign at 963 days, the third longest in the championship's history.

Los Guerreros Laguneros (2011–present)

Guerrero and Atlantis faced each other in a big grudge match on September 23, which saw Atlantis pick up the win. In July 2012, Guerrero officially fired Rey Escorpión from Los Guerreros del Infierno, and named Euforia and Niebla Roja as his replacements. On the August 3 Super Viernes show, Guerrero and Rojo Jr. lost the CMLL World Tag Team Championship to Atlantis and Diamante Azul, ending their reign at 640 days, the longest reign in the title's history.
 
In early 2013 the long-running feud between Atlantis and Último Guerrero came to the forefront of CMLL booking once more. The two were booked for the 2013 Torneo Nacional de Parejas Increibles tournament, forcing the two rivals to team up. Before their qualifying round both Atlantis and Gurrero stated that they would put their differences aside for the sake of the tournament. Atlantis and Guerrero displayed the teamwork they had developed by being partners in Los Guerreros de la Atlantida for several years as they defeated the teams of Valiente and Pólvora, Diamante Azul and Euforia and finally Dragón Rojo Jr. and Niebla Roja to qualify for the finals of the tournament. The finals took place as part of the 2013 Homenaje a Dos Leyendas show and saw La Sombra and Volador Jr. win the match and the tournament. Following the loss a frustrated Atlantis attacked Último Guerrero and tore his mask apart. Atlantis subsequently made a Luchas de Apuestas challenge to Último Guerrero that was not immediately accepted.  The two rivals officially signed the contract for the mask vs. mask match on March 21, but did not announce an actual date for the match. The act of signing a Luchas de Apuestas match between two of the top-ranked CMLL workers without announcing a specific date has let people to speculate that it would take place at the CMLL 80th Anniversary Show in September, 2013.  During the celebration of Atlantis' 30th anniversary as a wrestler Guerrero appeared after a match to berate Atlantis, which turned out to only be a distraction for the real Último Guerrero to attack Atlantis from behind. The two identically dressed Guerreros proceeded to beat up Atlantis and tear his mask apart. Following the match Último Guerrero introduced his brother "Gran Guerrero". It was not verified if Gran Guerrrero actually is the brother of Último Guerrero, someone not related to Guerrero, or as speculated by many his son who wrestled for CMLL as Taurus. The much anticipated and hyped Mask vs. Mask match between Guerrero and Atlantis at the 80th Anniversary Show on September 13 never came to fruition as the two were defeated in a Relevos Suicidas match by La Sombra and Volador Jr., who instead advanced to the Lucha de Apuestas against each other.

From January 14 to 19, 2014, Guerrero worked his first Fantastica Mania tour, co-produced by CMLL and New Japan Pro-Wrestling in Japan. On March 28, 2014, Guerrero, Euforia and Niebla Roja defeated Los Estetas del Aire (Máscara Dorada, Místico and Valiente) for the CMLL World Trios Championship. On August 29, Guerrero defeated La Sombra in the finals to win the 2014 Universal Championship, becoming the first two-time winner of the tournament. On September 19, Guerrero lost to Atlantis in the main event of the CMLL 81st Anniversary Show and thus was forced to unmask for the first time in his career and reveal his birth name; José Gutiérrez Hernández. In January 2015, Guerrero returned to Japan to take part in the Fantastica Mania 2015 tour, during which he defeated Atlantis in a rematch. On February 13, Los Guerreros Laguneros lost the CMLL World Trios Championship to Sky Team (Místico, Valiente and Volador Jr.). On July 17, Guerrero defeated Rey Escorpión in a Lucha de Apuestas in the main event of Sin Salida forcing Escorpión to have all his hair shaved off after the match as per the stipulation. On August 31, Guerrero defeated La Sombra to win the NWA World Historic Middleweight Championship. Guerrero closed out a successful 2016 by winning the 2016 Leyenda de Azul tournament, lastly eliminating Valiente.

During the 2018 Fantastica Mania tour of Japan, Último Guerrero and Gran Guerrero teamed up for the first ever CMLL Brothers tag team tournament. The Guerreros defeated Ángel de Oro and Niebla Roja in the first round and then Dragon Lee and Místico to win the tournament. On July 1, 2018 Los Guerreros, in this case Último Guerrero, Gran Guerrero and Euforia, defeated the Sky team (Místico, Valiente and Volador Jr.) for Guerrero's fourth CMLL WOrld Trios Championship reign. During their reign, Los Guerreros started a storyline feud with "The Cl4n" (Ciber the Main Man, The Chris and Sharlie Rockstar), which included The Cl4n defeating Los Guerreros at the CMLL 85th Anniversary Show, and lost the championship back to Los Guerreros two weeks later. On October 16, 2018, Guerrero defeated Diamante Azul to win the CMLL World Heavyweight Championship for a second time.

On May 31, 2019, Último Guerrero defeated Máscara Año 2000 in a lucha de apuestas match in the main event of the 2019 Juicio Final ("Final Justice") show, forcing Máscara Año 2000 to be shaved bald as a result. Following the Juicio Final show, Guerrero became involved in a multi-man storyline that included Bárbaro Cavernario, Big Daddy, Ciber the Main Man, Gilbert el Boricua, Negro Casas, and Volador Jr. All seven wrestlers faced off in a steel cage match as part of the CMLL 86th Anniversary Show, which saw Guerrero pin Negro Casas, forcing Casas to be shaved bald as a result. On March 26, 2021, they lost the Trios Championship against Nueva Generación Dinamita.

Total Nonstop Action Wrestling (2008)

In 2008 Total Nonstop Action Wrestling (TNA) invited Último Guerrero and Rey Bucanero, along with Averno and Volador Jr. to compete in the 2008 TNA World X Cup Tournament, making them that year's "Team Mexico" entrants, with Guerrero serving as the team captain. Último Guerrero and Rey Bucanero defeated Team Japan representatives "Speed Muscle" (Masato Yoshino and Naruki Doi) in the first round of the tournament. In the second round Guerrero lost to Team TNA's Kaz. Team Mexico was eliminated in a 12-man elimination match at Victory Road. Later during the same show Volador Jr. won an Ultimate X match, earning enough points for Team Mexico to win the entire tournament, becoming the 2008 World X Cup holders. Volador Jr. would work more matches for TNA, but Último Guerrero, Rey Bucanero and Averno did not.

Personal life
Many sources mistakenly list Hooligan and Ephesto as brothers of José Gutiérrez but they are not blood relatives. Gutiérrez, Ephesto, and Hooligan trained together and became close friends leading to often referring to each other as "brother" without having any blood relationship. Hooligan and Ephesto are brothers which is why Ephesto is sometimes mistaken for Gutiérrez's brother as well. In 2008 Último Guerrero introduced "Último Guerrero Jr." to the wrestling world. While it is not uncommon for fake relatives to be promoted in lucha libre, it is believed that Último Guerrero Jr. is indeed the son of Último Guerrero. Later on Guerrero Jr. would be reintroduced as Gran Guerrero, with the storyline explanation being that Gran Guerrero was the much younger brother of Último Guerrero.

On May 19, 2017 footage emerged of Daniel Alvarado (Brazo de Platino) and other members of the Alvarado family, notably his nephews José (Máximo Sexy), Felipe Alvarado (La Máscara), Psycho Clown and Robin, destroying a Ford Mustang belonging to Gutiérrez. The vandalism was reportedly motivated by the fact that Gutiérrez had spoken out against Felipe Alvarado as a possible the head of the wrestlers' union after the death of Alvarado's father. The head of the CMLL wrestlers' union had been in the Avarado family for over a decade and the Alvarado family believed it should go to someone in their family. The following day CMLL reportedly fired both Felipe and José Alvarado.

Championships and accomplishments

Consejo Mundial de Lucha Libre
CMLL World Heavyweight Championship (2 times)
CMLL World Light Heavyweight Championship (1 time)
CMLL World Tag Team Championship (6 times) – with Rey Bucanero (3), Dr. Wagner Jr. (1), Atlantis (1) and Dragón Rojo Jr. (1)
CMLL World Trios Championship (5 times) – with Atlantis and Tarzan Boy (1), Atlantis and Negro Casas (1), Euforia and Niebla Roja (1) and Euforia and Gran Guerrero (2)
NWA World Historic Middleweight Championship (1 time)
Carnaval Incredible Tournament (2000) – with Rey Bucanero and Mr. Niebla
Copa de Arena Mexico: 1999 – with El Satánico and Rey Bucanero
Copa Bobby Bonales (2014)
International Gran Prix (2006, 2007)
Leyenda de Azul (2016)
Torneo Gran Alternativa (1999 – with Blue Panther), (2008 – with Dragón Rojo Jr.) and (2011 – with Escorpión)
Universal Championship (2009, 2014)
CMLL Rudo of the Year (2009)
CMLL Tag Team of the Year (2010) – with Atlantis
Federacion Mundial de Lucha Libre
Champion du Monde (1 time)
International Wrestling Revolution Group
Copa Higher Power (1999) – with Astro Rey Jr., Máscara Mágica, Rey Bucanero and El Satánico
Lucha Libre Azteca
LLA Azteca Championship (2 times)
 New Japan Pro-Wrestling
 CMLL's Brother Tag Team Tournament (2018) – with Gran Guerrero
Pro Wrestling Illustrated
Ranked No. 10 of the best 500 singles wrestlers in the Pro Wrestling Illustrated (PWI) 500 in 2009.
Toryumon Mexico
Copa Mundial (2014)
Copa NSK (2013)
Total Nonstop Action Wrestling
TNA World X Cup (2008) – with Volador Jr., Rey Bucanero and Averno
Universal Wrestling Entertainment
UWE Tag Team Championship (1 time) – with Atlantis
World Wrestling Association
WWA World Tag Team Championship (1 time) – with Perro Aguayo Jr.
Wrestling Observer Newsletter
Best Tag Team of the Decade (2000–2009) – with Rey Bucanero
Wrestling Observer Newsletter Hall of Fame (Class of 2019)

Luchas de Apuestas record

Notes

References

1972 births
Living people
Mexican male professional wrestlers
Professional wrestlers from Durango
People from Gómez Palacio, Durango
Masked wrestlers
20th-century professional wrestlers
21st-century professional wrestlers
CMLL World Heavyweight Champions
CMLL World Light Heavyweight Champions
CMLL World Tag Team Champions
NWA World Historic Middleweight Champions